Iulia Hasdeu (14 November 1869 – 29 September 1888) was a Romanian poet, the daughter of writer and philologist Bogdan Petriceicu Hasdeu. From a very young age, Hasdeu wrote poems and prose in both Romanian and French, taught herself foreign languages and studied piano and opera singing. She was the first Romanian woman to study at La Sorbonne University in Paris.

Life
At the age of six she wrote her study of the life and work of Michael the Brave. Fluent in French, English, and German, she graduated from primary school at age eight, and at eleven she completed piano and classical singing at St. Sava Gymnasium and the Bucharest Conservatory of Music.

In 1881 her mother accompanied her to Paris, where she entered Sévigné College and passed the Baccalaureate exam. In 1886 Hasdeu enrolled at the Faculty of Letters and Philosophy at Sorbonne University and attended courses at the École des hautes études (School of Higher Studies) in Paris.

Hasdeu gave two lectures at the university on the logic of hypothesis and on the second book of Herodotus. She started writing a doctoral thesis with the theme centered on Romanian folk philosophy: logic, psychology, metaphysics, ethics, and theodicy.

While preparing her doctoral thesis, Hasdeu contracted tuberculosis in Paris.  After undergoing treatments in France, Italy and Switzerland, she returned to Bucharest. where she died on 29 September 1888 and was buried at Bellu Cemetery. Bogdan Hasdeu built her a temple in the family vault there.

Her father dedicated the rest of his life to publishing her works and memories, such as: Bourgeons d'Avril, Fantésies et Rêves, Chevalerie, Confidences en Canevas et Théâtre, Légendes et Contes, works which were published in French and Romanian. In her memory, he also built the Iulia Hasdeu Castle in Câmpina with the "spiritual guidance of his daughter," with whom he supposedly communicated until the end of his life.

Gallery

References

External links

Official website
Bogdan Petriceicu Hasdeu – Memorial Museum, The special daughter of a special scientist

1869 births
1888 deaths
Burials at Bellu Cemetery
University of Paris alumni
19th-century deaths from tuberculosis
Writers from Bucharest
Romanian philologists
Women philologists
19th-century Romanian poets
Romanian writers in French
Tuberculosis deaths in Romania
Romanian women poets
19th-century Romanian women writers
19th-century Romanian writers